The 1990 Grand Prix motorcycle racing season was the 42nd F.I.M. Road Racing World Championship season.

Season summary
1990 marked the beginning of the Rainey era with the Marlboro-Yamaha rider taking 7 wins and scoring points in every race but Hungary after he had already clinched the championship. Rainey's teammate was 1989 champion Eddie Lawson, but he was unable to defend his championship after breaking his left ankle in the first round and then severely shattering his right ankle the following round at Laguna Seca. Rainey on having Lawson as a teammate: “I just wanted to devastate Eddie. I don’t think he was ready for a team-mate like me. Maybe he thought he could control me, but at that stage I was past being controlled.” Rainey switched from Dunlop to Michelin tires this year.

Kevin Schwantz continued to win on his Suzuki but just as often he would crash. Australian Mick Doohan would win his first Grand Prix for Honda at the Hungaroring. 

The 1990 season continued the trend of crashes as riders tried to cope with the harsh power output of the V4 two-strokes. Honda put forth a proposition limiting the top class to 375cc and 3 cylinders, but that never caught on. Still, with 500cc lap times becoming stagnant, it was clear that something needed to be done.

Newcomer John Kocinski took the 250 title for Kenny Roberts' Marlboro-Yamaha squad after a tight points battle with Carlos Cardús that was not decided until the final race of the season. Despite five Grand Prix victories for Hans Spaan, seventeen-year-old Loris Capirossi became the youngest-ever world champion when he claimed the 125 crown for Honda.

1990 Grand Prix season calendar
The following Grands Prix were scheduled to take place in 1990:

Calendar changes
 The Australian Grand Prix was moved back from 9 April to 16 September.
 The German Grand Prix moved from the Hockenheimring to the Nürburgring.
 The Hungarian Grand Prix was added to the calendar.
 The Brazilian Grand Prix was taken off the calendar due to organisational problems.

Participants

500cc participants

250cc participants

125cc participants

Results and standings

Grands Prix

500cc riders' standings
Scoring system
Points are awarded to the top fifteen finishers. A rider has to finish the race to earn points.

250cc standings

125cc standings

References
 Büla, Maurice & Schertenleib, Jean-Claude (2001). Continental Circus 1949-2000. Chronosports S.A. 

Grand Prix motorcycle racing seasons